The Puleston Baronetcy, of Emral in the County of Flint, was a title in the Baronetage of the United Kingdom.  It was created on 2 November 1813 for Richard Parry Price, heir to the Puleston estates, who changed his surname accordingly. The title became extinct on the death of the fourth Baronet in 1896.

Puleston baronets, of Emral (1813)
Sir Richard Price Puleston, 1st Baronet (1765–1840)
Sir Richard Puleston, 2nd Baronet (1789–1860)
Sir Richard Price Puleston, 3rd Baronet (1813–1893)
Sir Theophilus Gresley Henry Puleston, 4th Baronet (1821–1896), died without heir.

References

Extinct baronetcies in the Baronetage of the United Kingdom